Keep Me in Mind is a 1970 album by Miriam Makeba.The album juxtaposes Makeba's own compositions, and one "Lumumba" by her daughter Bongi, with songs by Stephen Stills, Van Morrison, Lennon-McCartney and John Fogerty.

Track listing
"Lumumba" (Bongi Makeba)
"For What It's Worth" (Stephen Stills) 
"Brand New Day" (Van Morrison)
"I Shall Sing" (Van Morrison)
"Kulala" (Makeba)	
"In My Life" (Lennon-McCartney)
"Down On The Corner" (John Fogerty)
"Ibande" (Makeba)
"Measure The Valleys" (Robert Brittan)
"Tululu" (Makeba)

References

1970 albums
Miriam Makeba albums
Albums produced by Lewis Merenstein
Reprise Records albums